Cosmoglottics is a science that investigates world languages (or, universal languages); more specifically about universal artificial languages, its study and construction.

Cosmoglottics derives its name from the first planned language of Volapük and Esperanto. Volapük means "world speech" and is reflected in the German term Kosmoglosse, where kosmo  refers to "world" instead of "universe", giving rise to cosmoglottics. 

Sergey N. Kuznetsov makes an opposition between cosmoglottics, the science about universal planned language, and interlinguistics, the science about international languages and communication, founded by Otto Jespersen in 1931.

References

External links
Interlingvistiko en "kosma dimensio": vojaĝo inter kosmoglotiko kaj kosmolingvistiko by Sergey N. Kuznetsov (in Esperanto)

Linguistic universals